Francis Stephen Halliwell,  (born 1953), known as Stephen Halliwell, is a British classicist and academic. From 1995 he was Professor of Greek at the University of St Andrews and Wardlaw Professor of Classics from 2014 (Emeritus as of October 2020). Prior to that he taught at the universities of Oxford, London, Cambridge (where he was a Fellow of Corpus Christi College), and Birmingham. He has also held visiting positions at the University of Chicago, the Center for Ideas and Society (University of California, Riverside), Roma Tre University, McMaster University (H. L. Hooker Distinguished Visiting Professor), the Université catholique de Louvain (Chaire Cardinal Mercier), and Cornell University (Townsend Visiting Professor, Department of Classics). He was elected a Fellow of the Royal Society of Edinburgh in 2011 and a Fellow of the British Academy in 2014.

Although his publications cover a large span of topics in ancient Greek literature and philosophy, from Homer to Neoplatonism, Halliwell is best known for his extensive work on Ancient Greek comedy, especially Aristophanes, and on Greek philosophical poetics and aesthetics, especially in the writings of Plato and Aristotle. Two of his books have won international prizes: The Aesthetics of Mimesis, which was described in The Times Literary Supplement as 'formidable' and 'an outstanding example of taking ideas seriously', won the Premio Europeo di Estetica 2008; Greek Laughter, which one reviewer called 'monumental' and 'an extraordinary resource', won the Criticos Prize (since renamed the London Hellenic Prize) for 2008. Halliwell's characteristic style of tackling large issues of cultural significance through the fine-grained interpretation of texts led David Konstan, in reviewing Between Ecstasy and Truth, to call him ‘the ideal close reader’, whose arguments are ‘detailed, learned, and nuanced’.

Halliwell is an experienced lecturer who has given some two hundred invited research papers in nineteen countries. He has also made a number of appearances in broadcast media, including the BBC radio programme In Our Time. His work has been translated into nine languages.

Books
 Aristotle's Poetics, London and North Carolina, 1986/1998. 
 The Poetics of Aristotle: Translation and Commentary, London and North Carolina, 1987. 
 Plato Republic 10: with Translation and Commentary, Warminster, 1988. 
 Plato Republic 5: with Translation and Commentary, Warminster, 1993. 
 Aristotle Poetics, Longinus On the Sublime, Demetrius on Style, Loeb Classical Library, Cambridge Mass., 1995.  [Halliwell's contribution is Aristotle's Poetics]
 Aristophanes: Birds, Lysistrata, Assembly-Women, Wealth. A New Verse Translation with Introduction and Notes, Oxford, 1997. 
 Aristophanes: Birds and Other Plays, World's Classics, Oxford, 1998.  [= paperback of preceding item]
 The Aesthetics of Mimesis: Ancient Texts and Modern Problems, Princeton, 2002. 
 Greek Laughter: A Study of Cultural Psychology from Homer to Early Christianity, Cambridge, 2008. 
 Between Ecstasy and Truth: Interpretations of Greek Poetics from Homer to Longinus, Oxford, 2011. , 978-0198707011 (pbk)
 Aristophanes: Clouds, Women at the Thesmophoria, Frogs. A Verse Translation with Introduction and Notes, Oxford, 2015. 
 Aristophanes: Frogs and Other Plays, World's Classics, Oxford, 2016.  [= paperback of preceding item]
 Sul sublime, Milan, 2021. 
 Aristophanes: Acharnians, Knights, Wasps, Peace, Oxford, 2022. 
 Pseudo-Longinus: On the Sublime, Oxford, 2022.

References

1953 births
Living people
Scholars of ancient Greek literature
Scholars of Ancient Greek
British classical scholars
Classical scholars of the University of St Andrews
Fellows of the British Academy
Fellows of the Royal Society of Edinburgh